WEC 37: Torres vs. Tapia was a mixed martial arts event held by World Extreme Cagefighting on December 3, 2008 at the Hard Rock Hotel and Casino in Las Vegas, Nevada. The event aired live on the Versus Network.

Background
Former IFL standout Wagnney Fabiano made his WEC debut on this card.

A welterweight contest between Blas Avena and the returning Kevin Knabjian was originally scheduled for the undercard of this event, but it was later cancelled.

The Mark Muñoz-Ricardo Barros fight was the final light heavyweight bout to be put on by the WEC. The division was absorbed into the UFC following this event.

The event drew an estimated 671,000 viewers on Versus.

Results

Bonus Awards
Fighters were awarded $7,500 bonuses.

Fight of the Night:  Cub Swanson vs.  Hiroyuki Takaya
Knockout of the Night:  Bart Palaszewski
Submission of the Night:  Brian Bowles

Reported Payouts
The following is the reported payout to the fighters as reported to the Nevada State Athletic Commission. It does not include sponsor money or "locker room" bonuses often given by the WEC.

Miguel Torres: $44,000 (includes $22,000 win bonus) def. Manny Tapia: $6,000
Brian Bowles: $16,000 ($8,000 win bonus) def. Will Ribeiro: $4,000
Wagnney Fabiano: $22,000 ($11,000 win bonus) def. Akitoshi Tamura: $6,000
Joseph Benavidez: $17,000 ($8,500 win bonus) def. Danny Martinez: $2,000
Johny Hendricks: $16,000 ($8,000 win bonus) def. Justin Haskins: $3,000
Mark Muñoz: $20,000 ($10,000 win bonus) def. Ricardo Barros: $3,000
Diego Nunes: $6,000 ($3,000 win bonus) def. Cole Province: $3,000
Bart Palaszewski: $8,000 ($4,000 win bonus) def. Alex Karalexis: $8,000
Cub Swanson: $10,000 ($5,000 win bonus) def. Hiroyuki Takaya: $5,500
Shane Roller: $16,000 ($8,000 win bonus) def. Mike Budnik: $4,000

See also 
 World Extreme Cagefighting
 List of World Extreme Cagefighting champions
 List of WEC events
 2008 in WEC

External links
Official WEC website

References

World Extreme Cagefighting events
2008 in mixed martial arts
Mixed martial arts in Las Vegas
2008 in sports in Nevada
Hard Rock Hotel and Casino (Las Vegas)